Lamar Christopher Campbell (born August 29, 1976), nicknamed Soup, is a former professional American football player who played cornerback for five seasons for the Detroit Lions of the National Football League (NFL). He also served as the Vice President of Player Engagement of the Chicago Bears from 2015 to 2022.

Campbell was born and grew up in Chester, Pennsylvania, a suburb of Philadelphia. He attended the University of Wisconsin from 1994 to 1998 and, with a Degree in history, he left the university and signed as a free agent with the NFL Detroit Lions. He played with the Lions from 1998 to 2004.

After the NFL, he went on to intern in the Detroit Lions Scouting Department. During this period, Campbell fell in love with the aspect of Player Development and realized the opportunities available to advance his career after his professional football days were over. After becoming a licensed real estate broker in Atlanta, Campbell then took advantage of the prestigious Wharton School of Business Real Estate Program and the Sports Business Initiative Program offered by the NFL Player Development and studied real estate development and planning. In 2007, Campbell opened his own real estate company in Atlanta – The Success of Real Estate LLC.

In January 2022, Campbell was involved with a committee of Bears staffers to select the new general manager and head coach, which ultimately led to the hiring of Ryan Poles and Matt Eberflus, respectively. Ironically, on July 1, 2022, Campbell was fired by the Bears.

References

1976 births
Living people
Sportspeople from Chester, Pennsylvania
Players of American football from Pennsylvania
American football cornerbacks
Wisconsin Badgers football players
Detroit Lions players